Łask railway station is located on the outskirts of the Polish town of Łask, Łódź Voivodeship. It serves mostly regional traffic between Łódź and Sieradz, although it is also a stopping point for PKP Intercity services between Warsaw and Wrocław. The station is not classified by PKP, as it is officially owned by local municipal authorities.

Characteristics 
The station was built in the early 1900s and opened in 1902 as part of the Warsaw-Kalisz Railway. The building was made in a characteristic Renaissance Revival style, typical for smaller stations of this line, like those in Pabianice and Zduńska Wola. Currently the main building of the station is closed for passengers - doorways and windows are shut down with wooden planks, and its condition deteriorates. Passengers have to purchase their tickets from train conductors or ticket machines.

Aside the main line from Łódź to Kalisz, the station served a branch line leading to Zelów. Currently the line is shortened and repurposed as a branch line leading to an air force base located southeast of the station.

In the years 2018-2020 the station has been undergoing a major reconstruction of track and platform layout due to refurbishment works on the railway line between Łódź and Zduńska Wola. This resulted in creation of an island platform located in the middle of the station, with single-level crossing as the access way.

Train services
The station is served by the following services:

 Intercity services (IC) Wrocław Główny — Łódź — Warszawa Wschodnia
Intercity services (IC) Białystok - Warszawa - Łódź - Ostrów Wielkopolski - Wrocław
Intercity services (IC) Ełk - Białystok - Warszawa - Łódź - Ostrów Wielkopolski - Wrocław
 Intercity services (IC) Zgorzelec - Legnica - Wrocław - Ostrów Wielkopolski - Łódź - Warszawa
 InterRegio services (IR) Ostrów Wielkopolski — Łódź — Warszawa Główna
 InterRegio services (IR) Poznań Główny — Ostrów Wielkopolski — Łódź — Warszawa Główna
 Regiona services (PR) Łódź Kaliska — Ostrów Wielkopolski 
 Regional services (PR) Łódź Kaliska — Ostrów Wielkopolski — Poznań Główny

References 

Railway stations in Poland opened in 1902
Railway stations in Łódź Voivodeship
Railway stations served by Łódzka Kolej Aglomeracyjna